Our Mothers is a 2019 internationally co-produced drama film directed by César Díaz. It follows a forensic anthropologist in Guatemala investigating the disappearance of his father, a guerrilla fighter who went missing in the 1980s. It was screened at the 2019 Cannes Film Festival where Díaz won the Caméra d'Or.

Our Mothers was selected as the Belgian entry for the Best International Feature Film at the 92nd Academy Awards, but it was not nominated. It received six nominations at the 10th Magritte Awards, including Best Film and Best Director for Díaz, winning Best First Feature Film.

Accolades

See also
 List of submissions to the 92nd Academy Awards for Best International Feature Film
 List of Belgian submissions for the Academy Award for Best International Feature Film

References

External links
 

2019 films
2019 drama films
2010s Spanish-language films
Belgian drama films
Guatemalan drama films
Caméra d'Or winners
Magritte Award winners